Warlow is a municipality in Germany.

Warlow may also refer to:

 Warlow (True Blood)
 Warłów, village in Poland
 Anthony Warlow (born 1961), opera and musical theatre performer
 Craig Warlow (born 1975), rugby union player
 Jacob B. Warlow (1818–1890), law enforcement officer
 John Warlow (born 1939), dual-code rugby player
 Owain Warlow (born 1987), footballer

See also
 Warslow Athletic Club